Kat Men is an American/British rockabilly band, formed in 2006 by former Stray Cats drummer Slim Jim Phantom, and Darrel Higham. The duo released its debut album, Kat Men in 2006, with a follow-up, The Kat Men Cometh, released in 2013.

In 2012, Imelda May bassist Al Gare joined the band.

History
Kat Men formed in 2006 when drummer Slim Jim Phantom and guitarist Darrel Higham met during a jam session at the Oneida Casino, in Wisconsin. The duo subsequently embarked upon a European tour, and recorded their debut studio album, Kat Men with former Guns N' Roses guitarist Gilby Clarke. The duo continued to tour until 2009 before Higham departed in order to perform with his wife Imelda May. Phantom subsequently joined a reunited Stray Cats and performed in the band The Head Cat.

In 2011, the duo reunited and recorded a new studio album, The Kat Men Cometh, in 2012 for a March 25, 2013 release. Imelda May bassist Al Gare joined the band's touring line-up in 2012, with the band scheduled to embark upon a UK tour in October 2012.

In 2013, the band played at the Screamin' Festival.

Discography
Kat Men (2006)
The Kat Men Cometh (2013)

References

External links
Official website

Rockabilly music groups
Musical groups established in 2007